Sir Patrick Quinn  (1855 – 9 June 1936) was an Irish officer of the Metropolitan Police.

Biography

Quinn was born in 1855, the third son of Timothy Quinn and Bridget Nalty of County Mayo. In 1883, he was attached to the Criminal Investigation Department at Scotland Yard, and to the Special Branch of the CID in 1887. From 1903, he was Superintendent of the Special Branch, and he retired on 31 December 1918.

During his time at Special Branch he was engaged in the suppression of anarchism, and attached for protection duty to the suites of all foreign sovereigns visiting the United Kingdom. As a result, he received a large number of foreign orders and decorations: he was an Officer of the Legion of Honour and an officier de l'Instruction Publique of France, a Knight of the Order of the Dannebrog of Denmark, of the Order of Vasa of Sweden, of the Order of St Olav of Norway, of the Order of St Stanislas of Russia, of the Order of the Redeemer of Greece, of the Order of the Crown of Italy and of the Order of Villa Viçosa of Portugal, a member of the first class of the Order of Military Merit of Spain and of the fifth class of the Royal Victorian Order, and was awarded the King's Police Medal. Following his retirement he was knighted at Buckingham Palace on 18 March 1919. Quinn lived at 28 Montserrat Road, SW15. He died at home in Putney on 9 June 1936.

References

External links

 

1855 births
1936 deaths
People from County Mayo
Irish knights
Irish police officers
Metropolitan Police officers
Knights Bachelor
Members of the Royal Victorian Order
Irish recipients of the Queen's Police Medal
Metropolitan Police recipients of the Queen's Police Medal
Knights of the Order of the Dannebrog
Officiers of the Légion d'honneur
Recipients of the Ordre des Palmes Académiques
Knights of the Order of Vasa
Knights of the Order of the Immaculate Conception of Vila Viçosa